Tumi Ashbe Bole is a 2021 Bengali romantic film directed by Sujit Mondal. The film is produced by Nispal Singh under the banner of Surinder Films, and stars Bonny Sengupta, Koushani Mukherjee in lead role. The film was released on 22 January 2021.

Cast

 Bonny Sengupta as Raja/Nandagopal Goswami
 Koushani Mukherjee as Ankhi
 Kaushik Banerjee
 Palash Ganguly as Rocky
 Buddhadeb Bhattacharjee

Soundtrack

The soundtrack of the film is composed by Jeet Ganguly and lyrics by Priyo Chattopadhyay

References

External links
 

Bengali-language Indian films
2021 films
2021 romance films
Indian romance films
2020s Bengali-language films
Films scored by Jeet Ganguly